At one time, two different NASCAR races were known as the DirecTV 500:

 For the spring race at Martinsville Speedway in 2006, see STP 500
 For the spring race at Texas Motor Speedway in 2000, see O'Reilly Auto Parts 500